Moments from Ephemeral City is the first full-length album by Australian progressive metal band Caligula’s Horse. The album was released independently on April 2, 2011. The album was recorded from 2010 to 2011 in various makeshift studios around the Gold Coast and Brisbane and was produced, mixed, mastered and engineered by guitarist Sam Vallen.

Track listing
Lyrics and music by Vallen. Additional music and lyric contributions by Grey on tracks 1, 8, and 9.

Personnel
Caligula’s Horse
 Jim Grey – vocals
 Sam Vallen – guitar
 Zac Greensill – guitar
 Dave Couper – bass
 Geoff Irish – drums
Production
 Sam Vallen – producer, mixing, mastering, engineering, layout
 Lemi Fleming – artwork
 Stephanie Bernard – photography

References

2011 debut albums
Caligula's Horse (band) albums
Albums produced by Sam Vallen
Self-released albums